The Spain women's national football team has represented Spain in international women's football competition since 1980, and is controlled by the Royal Spanish Football Federation, the governing body for football in Spain.

Spain have qualified two times for the FIFA Women's World Cup and three times for the UEFA Women's Championship, reaching the semifinals in 1997. In contrast to these modest achievements at senior level, their youth teams have one of the best records in the world across the early 21st century and enjoyed great success in 2018 in particular, winning two continental titles (U-17 and U-19), and reaching the two World Cup finals (winning the U-17 World Cup and runners-up in the U-20 World Cup. This was followed up four years later when they won the 2022 U-20 World Cup and the 2022 U-17 World Cup in the same calendar year.

Spain broke into the top 10 of the FIFA international rankings in the early 2020s. Their players collected the 2020 UEFA awards for best goalkeeper, defender, midfielder, forward and overall best player – the first time players from a single nation won all the categories.

History

Early years
After underground women's football clubs started appearing in Spain around 1970 one of its instigators, Rafael Muga, decided to create a national team. It was an unofficial project as football was considered an unsuitable sport for women by both the Royal Spanish Football Federation and National Movement's Women's Section, which organized women's sports in Francoist Spain. When asked about the initiative in January 1971 RFEF president José Luis Pérez Payá answered I'm not against women's football, but I don't like it either. I don't think it's feminine from an esthetic point of view. Women are not favored wearing shirt and trousers. Any regional dress would fit them better.

One month later, on 21 February 1971, the unofficial Spanish national team, including Conchi Sánchez, who played professionally in the Italian league, made its debut in Murcia's La Condomina against Portugal, ending in a 3–3 draw. The team wasn't allowed to wear RFEF's crest and the referee couldn't wear an official uniform either. On 15 July, with a 5-days delay for transfer issues, it played its first game abroad against Italy in Turin's Stadio Comunale, suffering an 8–1 defeat. It was then invited to the 2nd edition of unofficial women's world cup (Mundialito 1981), but RFEF forbid them to take part in the competition. Despite these conditions Spain was entrusted hosting the 1972 World Cup. RFEF vetoed the project, and the competition was cancelled and disbanded. The unofficial Spanish team itself broke up shortly after.

1980s: Officiality of the team
After the transition to democracy in the second half of the decade RFEF finally accepted women's football in November 1980, creating first a national cup and next a national team, which finally made its debut under coach Teodoro Nieto on 5 February 1983 in A Guarda, Pontevedra. The opponent was again Portugal, which defeated Spain 0–1. The team subsequently played 2-leg friendlies against France and Switzerland drawing with both opponents in Aranjuez and Barcelona and losing in Perpignan before it finally clinched its first victory in Zürich (0–1). On 27 April 1985 it played its first official match in the 1987 European Championship's qualification, losing 1–0 against Hungary. After losing the first four matches Spain defeated Switzerland and drew with Italy to end third. The team also ended in its group's bottom positions in the subsequent 1989 and 1991 qualifiers. After the former Nieto was replaced by Ignacio Quereda, who has coached the team since 1 September 1988. Years later he would confess: There was never love or support from the Federation towards those women soccer players.

Teodoro Nieto left the most International Footballer Conchi sanchez (Amancio) out of the Spanish Team even when the player was the first Capitain during the 70s, She was playing in Italy at the time winning championships and Italian Cups, there was not substantial reasons to leave such extraordinary player out at the peak of her career, the damaged was done to such brilliant player who loved to play for her country and fully deserved more respect and recognition.

1990s and 2000s: Growing up
The 1995 Euro qualifying marked an improvement as Spain ended 2nd, one point from England, which qualified for the final tournament. In these qualifiers Spain attained its biggest victory to date, a 17–0 over Slovenia. In the 1997 Euro qualifying it made a weaker performance, including a record 0–8 loss against Sweden in Gandia, but the European Championship was expanded to eight teams and Spain still made it to the repechage, where it defeated England on a 3–2 aggregate to qualify for the competition for the first time. In the first stage the team drew 1–1 against France, lost 0–1 against host Sweden, and beat 1–0 Russia to qualify on goal average over France to the semifinals, where it was defeated 2–1 by Italy. All three goals were scored by Ángeles Parejo.

This success was followed by a long series of unsuccessful qualifiers. In the 1999 World Cup's qualifying Spain ended last for the first time, not winning a single game. In the 2001 Euro's it made it to the repechage, where it suffered a 3–10 aggregate defeat against Denmark. In the 2003 World Cup's it again ended last despite starting with a 6–1 win over Iceland. In the 2005 Euro's, where a 9–1 win over Belgium was followed by a 5-game non scoring streak, it ended 3rd behind Denmark and Norway. In the 2007 World Cup's the team again ended 3rd behind Denmark and Finland despite earning 7 more points.

In the 2009 Euro's Spain made its better performance since the 1995 qualifiers, narrowly missing qualification as England clinched the top position by overcoming a 2–0 in the final match's second half. Spain had to play the repechage, where it lost both games against the Netherlands. In the 2011 World Cup's Spain again ended 2nd, with no repechage, after England again overcame a half-time 2–0 in their second confrontation.

2010s: First World Cups
Spain achieved 16 years later a place for the final stage of a European Championship. The team qualified for the UEFA Women's Euro 2013, after beating Scotland in the qualifiers playoff. In the group stage, a win over England and a draw against Russia was enough to qualify for the quarterfinals, where they were eliminated by Norway.

Two years later, Spain qualified for the first time ever to a World Cup, winning nine of its ten matches of the qualifying round. In the group stage of the 2015 FIFA Women's World Cup. Their campaign, however, ended up being a disaster. Spain managed only a 1–1 draw into the weakest team in the group, Costa Rica, before losing 0–1 to Brazil. In the last match with South Korea, they still lost 1–2 after an initial lead, becoming the worst European team in the tournament. After the World Cup, the 23 players on the roster issued a collective statement for the end of Ignacio Quereda's reign as head coach. Later that summer, Quereda stepped down and was replaced by Jorge Vilda, who had previously coached the U-19 team, and was on the shortlist for the 2014 FIFA World Coach of the Year.

Spain has achieved to qualify for the UEFA Women's Euro 2017 by winning all the matches and ahead in 11 points to the second classified.
In 2017 the national team participated for the first time in the Algarve Cup winning the tournament.
However, its performance in the UEFA Women's Euro 2017 was very disappointing: only one match won (against Portugal, the worst ranked team in Euro), two defeats against England (0–2) and Scotland (0–1) in group stage, Miraculously Spain advanted to the quarter-finals, where losing against Austria in a quarter-final finishing 0–0 after extra time, then 3–5 in penalty shoot-out. Eventually, the national football team was eliminated after more than 345 minutes without scoring a single goal.

At the 2019 Women's World Cup, Spain were in Group B with China PR, South Africa, and Germany. They finished second in the group to progress to the knockout stage of a World Cup for the first time in their history. However, the team was eliminated in the round of 16 by the eventual champions United States.

In October 2019, the federation announced the creation of España Promesas (essentially Spain B), a team for players too old for younger age groups but not in the latest full squad, to provide training and occasional match experience for those in consideration for the future, that was later reconverted and renamed Spain under-23.

2020s: Lacklustre Golden Generation
Spain qualified for the UEFA Women's Euro 2022 undefeated and assembled what would be the strongest ever Spanish team in history, and was ranked among the top contenders for the title. However, just before the tournament began, Spain suffered two big blows, with both Jennifer Hermoso and Alexia Putellas withdrew due to injury. Without the two taliswomen in the squad, Spain failed to perform at full expectation in the tournament and only reached the quarter-finals in second place after Germany. Spain then performed well against England, even took the lead in 54' by Esther González, but conceded a late equalizer by Ella Toone before Georgia Stanway crushed Spain's hope to win a major European title in extra time.

Competitive record

FIFA Women's World Cup

UEFA Women's Championship

Other tournaments

Results and fixtures

 The following is a list of match results in the last 12 months, as well as any future matches that have been scheduled.

Legend

2022

2023

Overall official record

Coaching staff

Current coaching staff

Manager history
 Updated on 23 February 2023

Players

Current squad
The following players were called up for the 2023 Cup of Nations from 16 to 22 February 2023.
Caps and goals as of 23 February 2023

Recent call-ups
 The following players were also named to a squad in the last 12 months.

INJ Player withdrew from the squad due to an injury.
PRE Preliminary squad.
WD Player has been withdrew from the squad due to non-injury issue.

Previous squads

World Cup
 2015 FIFA Women's World Cup squad
 2019 FIFA Women's World Cup squad

European Football Championship
 UEFA Women's Championship 1997 squad
 UEFA Women's Euro 2013 squad
 UEFA Women's Euro 2017 squad
 UEFA Women's Euro 2022 squad

Others
 Algarve Cup 2017 squad
 Cyprus Cup 2018 squad
 Algarve Cup 2019 squad
 SheBelieves Cup 2020 squad
 Arnold Clark Cup 2022 squad
 Cup of Nations 2023 squad

Honours

Titles

Algarve Cup
Champions: 2017
Cyprus Cup
Champions: 2018

SheBelieves Cup
Runners-up: 2020
Arnold Clark Cup
Runners-up: 2022
FFA Cup of Nations
Runners-up: 2023

Albena Cup
Third place: 1995

Individual awards

UEFA Women's Championship All-Star Team: Verónica Boquete (2013), Aitana Bonmatí (2022)
Grand Hotel Varna Tournament top scorer: Mar Prieto (1992)
Algarve Cup best player: Irene Paredes (2017)
Cyprus Cup Golden Glove: Dolores Gallardo (2018) 
Algarve Cup top scorer: Jennifer Hermoso (2019)

SheBelieves Cup best player: Alexia Putellas (2020)
SheBelieves Cup top scorer: Lucía García and Alexia Putellas (2020)
Arnold Clark Cup best player: Athenea del Castillo (2022)
Arnold Clark Cup top scorer: Alexia Putellas (2022)
Cup of Nations top scorer: Esther González (2023)

Other awards
Premios Nacionales del Deporte (National Sports Awards): Baron de Güell Cup (2014)

Records
Caps and goals as of 23 February 2023.
Players in bold are still active, at least at club level.

Most caps

Most goals

Captains

Most clean sheets

Clean Sheets: Goalkeeper must play at least 60 minutes to obtain the points of a clean sheet.Average: percentage of clean sheets achieved per gameRatio: goals concered per game

Hat-tricks

X The subscript indicates the number of goals scored by each player in that match

Rankings
FIFA Women's World Rankings

*13 October 2022

UEFA Women's National Team Coefficient Ranking

Ziaian Women's Football Rankings

**21 February 2023

Youth teams

Under-23
The Spain under-23 is a football team operated under the auspices of the Royal Spanish Football Federation.
Its primary role is the development of players in preparation for the senior Spain women's national team.

Under-20

Under-19

Under-18

Under-17

FIFA Under-17 Women's World Cup

UEFA Women's Under-17 Championship

Under-16
There is also a women's national team that represents Spain in international football in under-16 categories and is controlled by the Royal Spanish Football Federation.
This team usually participates each year in UEFA Women U-16 Development Tournament (although it is not an official tournament) with remarkable success

See also

 Women's football in Spain
 Spain women's national under-20 football team
 Spain women's national under-19 football team
 Spain women's national under-17 football team
 Spain women's national under-23 football team
 Spain women's national futsal team
 Spain women's national beach soccer team
 Women's football in Spain
 Spanish football league system
 Sport in Spain

References

External links

 by RFEF
RFEF site
FIFA profile

 
European women's national association football teams